Anja Wilhelm (born 26 September 1968) is a German former gymnast. She competed in three events; team all around, individual all around, and the balance beam final at the 1984 Summer Olympics. Wilhelm also won twelve national titles during her career.

References

External links
 

1968 births
Living people
German female artistic gymnasts
Olympic gymnasts of West Germany
Gymnasts at the 1984 Summer Olympics
People from Wolfsburg
Sportspeople from Lower Saxony